Kalanidhi or Kalanithi may refer to:

Kalanidhi Indira Sangeet Mahavidyalaya, a Nepal classical music school
Sangeetha Kalanidhi, an award given by the Madras Music Academy

People with the surname
A. Kalanithi, Indian politician
Kalanithi Maran, Indian media baron
Kalanidhi Narayanan, Indian dancer
Kalanidhi Veeraswamy, Indian politician
Manju Latha Kalanidhi, Indian journalist
Paul Kalanithi, Indian-American neurosurgeon

Indian masculine given names